Libreville is the capital and largest city of Gabon. Occupying  in the northwestern province of Estuaire, Libreville is a port on the Komo River, near the Gulf of Guinea. As of the 2013 census, its population was 703,904.

The area has been inhabited by the Mpongwe people since before the French acquired the land in 1839. It was later an American Christian mission, and a slave resettlement site, before becoming the chief port of the colony of French Equatorial Africa. By the time of Gabonese independence in 1960, the city was a trading post and minor administrative centre with a population of 32,000. Since 1960, Libreville has grown rapidly and now is home to one-third of the national population.

History 

Various native peoples lived in or used the area that is now Libreville before colonization, including the Mpongwé tribe. French Admiral Louis Edouard Bouët-Willaumez negotiated a trade and protection treaty with the local Mpongwé ruler, Antchoué Komé Rapontcombo (known to the French as King Denis), in 1839.

American missionaries from New England established a mission in Baraka, Gabon, on what is now Libreville, in 1842. In 1846, the Brazilian slave ship L'Elizia, carrying slaves from the Congo, was captured near Loango by the French navy which was tasked with contributing to the British Blockade of Africa. Fifty-two of the freed slaves were resettled on the site of Libreville (French for "Freetown") in 1849. Following the French Revolution of 1848 and establishment of the French Second Republic, the former slaves organized an election to select leaders of the new village in 1849. A former slave named Mountier was elected Mayor of Libreville. Libreville was the administrative capital of the France's Congo-Gabon colony between 1888 and 1904, when the capital moved to Brazzaville.

In 1910, Gabon became part of French Equatorial Africa (Afrique équatoriale française, AEF). French companies were allowed to exploit the Middle Congo (modern-day Congo-Brazzaville). It soon became necessary to build a railroad that would connect Brazzaville, the terminus of the river navigation on the Congo River and the Ubangui River, with the Atlantic coast. As rapids make it impossible to navigate on the Congo River past Brazzaville, and the coastal railroad terminus site had to allow for the construction of a deep-sea port, authorities chose the site of Ponta Negra instead of Libreville as originally envisaged. Construction of the Congo–Ocean Railway began in 1921, and Libreville was surpassed by the rapid growth of Pointe-Noire, farther down the coast.  Libreville received its first bank branch when Bank of West Africa (BAO) opened a branch in 1930. In 1940, Libreville was the central focus of the Battle of Gabon as Charles de Gaulle's Free French forces, supported by the Royal Navy, moved to consolidate control over French Equatorial Africa.

With national independence on the horizon, Léon M'ba won Libreville's first free mayoral election in 1956. Mba was later the first president of independent Gabon. The city's population was only 32,000 at independence, but grew rapidly thereafter. It now houses one-third of the national population.

Geography 

From north to south, major districts of the city are the residential area Batterie IV, Quartier Louis (known for its nightlife), Mont-Bouët and Nombakélé (busy commercial areas), Glass (the first European settlement in Gabon), Oloumi (a major industrial area) and Lalala, a residential area. The city's port and train station on the Trans-Gabon Railway line to Franceville lie in Owendo, south of the main built-up area. Inland from these districts lie poorer residential areas. North-west of Equatorial Guinea is where the city stands, labeling the city as a part of north-west Gabon. In terms of the country's surrounding boundaries, north is Cameroon, east is Congo, and south-east is the Democratic Republic of the Congo. It also rides the shores of the South Atlantic Ocean, which is on the country's west coast for reference. Additionally, in terms of aquatic geography, the Komo River passes through the city and empties into the ocean. The Komo River also stands as a potential hydroelectric source of power for the city which could generate supportive amounts of energy and power. Several city districts provide distinct and separate benefits throughout the city as well. In terms of nightlife, the Quartier Louis sector is most renowned. One of this zone's sides includes the coast, and this heavily influences the possible activities available in the area. Commercial areas within Libreville are housed in the Mont-Bouët and Nombakélé districts, which feature several shopping centers and stations selling purchasable goods. Oloumi contains much of the city's industry, integrating production separately from the districts that focus upon other aspects. Finally, Lalala and Batterie IV are residential and housing sectors, where much of the populace resides.

Climate 
Libreville features a tropical monsoon climate (Am) with a lengthy wet season and a short dry season. The city's wet season spans about nine months (September through May), with a great deal of rain falling during these months. Its dry season lasts from June through August, and is caused by the cold Benguela Current reaching its northernmost extent and suppressing rainfall. Despite the lack of rain, Libreville remains very cloudy during this time of year.

Transport

National Taxis operate around the city. Each district has a colour for its taxis and Libreville's is red.

The National Society of Transport (SOGATRA) launched new taxis that operate on a counter system in 2014.

The Gabonese Transport Company operates a bus service to all districts of Libreville.

Culture
 Arboretum de Sibang

Education 
The Omar Bongo University was founded in 1970.

There are several high-end international schools in Libreville, including:
 American International School of Libreville – American curriculum
 Lycée Blaise Pascal de Libreville – French curriculum
 International School of Gabon Ruban Vert – IB curriculum

Places of worship   
 
Among the places of worship, they are predominantly Christian churches and temples: Roman Catholic Archdiocese of Libreville (Catholic Church), Église de l'Alliance chrétienne et missionnaire du Gabon (Alliance World Fellowship), Assemblies of God, Evangelical Church of Gabon. There are also Muslim mosques.

Languages 
Libreville is one of several African cities where French is truly becoming a native language, with some local features.

Economy
The city is home to a shipbuilding industry, brewing industry, and sawmills. The city exports raw materials such as wood, rubber and cocoa from the city's main port, and the deepwater port at Owendo.

Gabon Airlines has its headquarters in Libreville. Prior to their dissolutions, both Air Gabon and Gabon Express were headquartered on the grounds of Libreville International Airport.

The French Army's 6th Marine Infantry Battalion is based in the north of the city.

Notable residents
Nadège Noële Ango-Obiang, writer and economist
Pierre-Emerick Aubameyang, footballer who plays for Chelsea and the Gabon Team
Daniel Cousin, footballer who played for Larissa FC and the Gabon National Team
Marcel Lefebvre, traditionalist Roman Catholic bishop, served as a missionary in Libreville
Léon M'ba, first Prime Minister and first President of Gabon
Anthony Obame, Olympic silver medalist in the men's Taekwondo 80+ kg at the 2012 Summer Olympics.
Charles Tchen, Honorary consul for the Kingdom of the Netherlands in Gabon
Chris Silva, professional basketball player for the Miami Heat
Simone Saint-Dénis, trade union leader

References

Bibliography

External links 

  Site officiel de la Mairie de Libreville

 
Populated places established in 1848
Capitals in Africa
Port cities in Africa
1848 establishments in the French colonial empire
1848 establishments in Africa
Ports and harbours of Gabon
American colonization movement